Auguste Boyer (13 March 1896 – 21 October 1956) was a French professional golfer prominent on the European circuit in the 1920s and 1930s. He won four Italian Opens, four German Opens, three Swiss Opens, two Belgian Opens, and one Dutch Open. He also finished runner-up three times in his home French Open.

Boyer was born in Cagnes-sur-Mer and died in Nice.

Tournament wins (16)
this list may be incomplete
1926 Italian Open
1928 Italian Open
1930 German Open, Italian Open
1930 Swiss Open
1931 Italian Open
1932 Dutch Open, German Open
1933 Belgian Open, French PGA Championship
1934 Swiss Open
1935 German Open, Swiss Open, Addington Foursomes (with Francis Francis)
1936 Belgian Open, German Open

Team appearances
France-Great Britain Professional Match (representing France): 1929
Continental Europe-United States Match (non-playing captain): 1953

References

French male golfers
People from Cagnes-sur-Mer
Sportspeople from Alpes-Maritimes
1896 births
1956 deaths
20th-century French people